This is a list of things named after Bill Clinton,  the 42nd president of the United States.

Schools
 Clinton School of Public Service at the University of Arkansas in Fayetteville, Arkansas

Libraries
 Clinton Presidential Center in Little Rock, Arkansas

Institutions
 Clinton Foundation

Airport
 Clinton National Airport in Little Rock

Roads
 Bill Clinton Boulevard in Pristina, Kosovo

Buildings
 The Clinton Centre in Enniskillen, Northern Ireland
 William Jefferson Clinton Federal Building headquarters to the EPA in Washington, D.C.

See also
Presidential memorials in the United States
List of places named for George Washington
List of places named for Thomas Jefferson
List of places named for James Monroe
List of places named for Andrew Jackson
List of places named for James K. Polk
List of things named after Ronald Reagan
List of things named after George H. W. Bush
List of things named after George W. Bush
List of things named after Barack Obama
List of things named after Donald Trump
List of educational institutions named after presidents of the United States

References

Clinton, Bill
Bill Clinton-related lists